Nectandra krugii, Krug's sweetwood, is a species of plant in the family Lauraceae. It is found in Antigua and Barbuda, Dominica, the Dominican Republic, Guadeloupe, Hispaniola, Martinique, Netherlands Antilles, and Puerto Rico.

References

krugii
Flora of the Caribbean
Taxonomy articles created by Polbot